Raimondia is a genus of flies belonging to the family Sarcophagidae.

Species:
 Raimondia uruhuasi Townsend, 1917

References

Sarcophagidae